Andrew "Drew" Broatch (birth unknown) is a Scottish former rugby union, and professional rugby league footballer who played in the 1960s and 1970s.

Playing career

International honours
Drew Broatch represented Other Nationalities (RL) while at Leeds, he played  in the 2–19 defeat by St. Helens at Knowsley Road, St. Helens on Wednesday 27 January 1965, to mark the switching-on of new floodlights, and represented Commonwealth XIII (RL) while at Leeds in 1965 against New Zealand at Crystal Palace National Recreation Centre, London on Wednesday 18 August 1965.

County Cup Final appearances
Drew Broatch played right-, i.e. number 3, in Leeds' 2–18 defeat by Wakefield Trinity in the 1964–65 Yorkshire County Cup Final during the 1964–65 season at Fartown Ground, Huddersfield on Saturday 31 October 1964.

Genealogical information
Drew Broatch is the nephew of the Scottish rugby union, rugby league footballer, and rugby league coach; Alex Fiddes.

References

External links
Search for "Broatch" at rugbyleagueproject.org
Hawick YM RFC – History
Hawick YM RFC – History
Hawick RFC: history of the club – International players – books
News has reached us this week that Drew Broatch has recently been hospitalized… (6 January 2018)

Living people
Bradford Bulls players
Hawick RFC players
Hunslet R.L.F.C. players
Leeds Rhinos players
Other Nationalities rugby league team players
Rugby league five-eighths
Rugby league players from Hawick
Rugby league wingers
Rugby union fly-halves
Rugby union players from Hawick
Scottish rugby league players
Scottish rugby union players
Year of birth missing (living people)
York Wasps players